The 1928 Temple Owls football team was an American football team that represented Temple University as an independent during the 1928 college football season. In its fourth season under head coach Heinie Miller, the team compiled a 7–1–2 record.  Quarterback Howard "Barney" Gugel was the team captain.

The team played its home games at the newly built Temple Stadium in Philadelphia. The dedication of the stadium occurred two weeks later on October 13.

Schedule

Notes

References

Temple
Temple Owls football seasons
Temple Owls football